Lindenius is a genus of wasps in the family  Crabronidae. Most species are found in the Palearctic a few are Nearctic.63 species are known

References

External links
 Lindenius images at  Consortium for the Barcode of Life
  Catalog of Sphecidae California Academy of Sciences Institute of Biodiversity

Crabronidae
Taxa named by Amédée Louis Michel le Peletier
Taxa named by Gaspard Auguste Brullé
Apoidea genera